Paul Geister (born 29 January 1972) is a former Australian rules footballer who played with North Melbourne and Port Adelaide in the Australian Football League (AFL).

Geister, who joined North Melbourne in 1994, spent his time at the club as an understudy to full-back Mick Martyn. He made his debut in the final round of the 1995 AFL season and then appeared in two finals, a qualifying final win over Richmond and semi final against the West Coast Eagles.

After playing reserves for the entire 1996 season, the same year the seniors won a premiership, Geister was put up for trade in the 1996 AFL draft. He was traded to Port Adelaide for the Kingsley brothers, Kent and Wade, but played just one senior game at his new club. Geister however had some success at Central District and was the full-back in their 2000 and 2001 premierships.

References

External links
 
 

1972 births
Port Adelaide Football Club players
Port Adelaide Football Club players (all competitions)
North Melbourne Football Club players
Central District Football Club players
Australian rules footballers from South Australia
Living people